Gérard Bailly (born 28 January 1940) is a member of the Senate of France, representing the Jura department.

References

1940 births
Living people
Place of birth missing (living people)
Union for a Popular Movement politicians
French Senators of the Fifth Republic
Senators of Jura (department)